The Global Spirit Tour was a worldwide concert tour by English electronic music band Depeche Mode in support of the group's 14th studio album, Spirit. During the summer 2017, the band played to more than 3 million fans in total. This is the last concert tour to feature keyboardist Andy Fletcher before his death 5 years later on May 26, 2022.

The tour found the band continuing their charity partnership with Swiss watchmaker Hublot, raising money and awareness for Charity: Water toward its mission of providing safe drinking water to everyone in the world. To promote their worldwide tour, Depeche Mode gave a promotional concert at the Funkhaus Berlin on 17 March in front of 1000 fans and streamed live on the internet.

With 130 live shows, the Global Spirit Tour is Depeche Mode's longest tour. Previously, the longest one was the Touring the Angel, with 124 live shows.

Setlist
Setlist for European and United States Promo and Rehearsal Shows for fans

"Scum"
"Going Backwards"
"So Much Love"
"Corrupt"
"A Pain That I'm Used To" (Jacques Lu Cont's remix)
"World in My Eyes"
"Cover Me"
"World in My Eyes"
Song performed by Martin Gore
"Little Soul" (Acoustic)
"Home" 
"Where's the Revolution"
"Barrel of a Gun"
"Enjoy the Silence"
"Walking in My Shoes" (With bits from the 'Random Carpet' Mix)
"Barrel of a Gun"
"Personal Jesus"
"Enjoy the Silence"

Setlist for Europe (Leg #1) and North America (Leg #2)

"Going Backwards"
"So Much Love"
"Policy of Truth"
"It's No Good"
"Barrel of a Gun" (Including a verse of Grandmaster Flash and the Furious Five's The Message)
"A Pain That I'm Used To" (Jacques Lu Cont's remix)
"Corrupt"
"Useless"
"In Your Room" (Album Version)
"Precious"
"World in My Eyes"
"Cover Me"
Song performed by Martin Gore
"A Question of Lust" (Acoustic)
"Home" 
"Judas" (Acoustic)
"Shake the Disease" (Acoustic)
"Somebody"
"Strangelove" (Acoustic)
"Insight" (Acoustic)
"Sister of Night (Acoustic)
Song performed by Martin Gore
"A Question of Lust" (Acoustic)
"Home"
"Poison Heart"
"In Your Room" (Album Version)
"Policy of Truth"
"Precious"
"Where's the Revolution"
"Wrong"
"Everything Counts"
"Stripped"
"Black Celebration"
"Enjoy the Silence"
"Never Let Me Down Again"
Song performed by Martin Gore
"Home"
"Judas" (Acoustic)
"Somebody"
"Strangelove" (Acoustic)
"Shake the Disease" (Acoustic)
"But Not Tonight" (Acoustic, only performed once)
"Walking in My Shoes" (With bits from the 'Random Carpet' Mix))
"Heroes" (David Bowie cover)
"Black Celebration"
"Policy of Truth"
"I Feel You"
"Personal Jesus"

Setlist for Europe (Leg #3), Latin (Leg #4) and North America  (Leg #5)
"Going Backwards"
"It's No Good"
"So Much Love"
"Barrel of a Gun" (Including a verse of Grandmaster Flash and the Furious Five's The Message)
"A Pain That I'm Used To" (Jacques Lu Cont's remix)
"Useless"
"Precious"
"In Your Room" (Album Version)
"World in My Eyes"
"Cover Me"
Song performed by Martin Gore 
"A Question of Lust" (Acoustic)
"Insight" (Acoustic)
"Sister of Night" (Acoustic)
"Judas" (Acoustic)
"The Things You Said"
Song performed by Martin Gore
"Home" (Acoustic Intro)
"In Your Room" (Album Version)
"Precious"
"Where's the Revolution"
"Policy of Truth"
"Wrong"
"Everything Counts"
"Stripped"
"Halo"
"Policy of Truth"
"Black Celebration"
"Enjoy the Silence"
"Never Let Me Down Again"
Song performed by Martin Gore 
"Judas" (Acoustic)
"Strangelove" (Acoustic)
"I Want You Now" (Acoustic)
"Somebody"
"Walking in My Shoes" (With bits from the 'Random Carpet' Mix)
"Policy of Truth"
"A Question of Time"
"Heroes" (David Bowie cover) (Only performed at final show)
"I Feel You"
"Personal Jesus"
"Just Can't Get Enough" (Only performed at final show)

Setlist for European Festival Tour (Leg 6)
"Going Backwards"
"It's No Good"
"A Pain That I'm Used To" (Jacques Lu Cont's remix)
"Precious"
"Useless"
"Policy Of Truth"
"Precious"
"World In My Eyes"
"Cover Me"
Song performed by Martin Gore  
"The Things You Said"
"Somebody"
"In Your Room" (Album Version)
"Everything Counts"
"Stripped"
"Enjoy The Silence"
"Personal Jesus"
"Never Let Me Down Again"
Song performed by Martin Gore  
"Somebody"
"Walking In My Shoes" (With bits from the 'Random Carpet' Mix)
"Enjoy The Silence"
"Just Can't Get Enough"

Shows

Notes

Musicians

Depeche Mode
Andy Fletcher – keyboards
Dave Gahan – lead vocals
Martin Gore – guitar, keyboards, lead and backing vocals

Additional musicians
Christian Eigner – drums
Peter Gordeno – keyboards, piano, bass guitar, backing vocals

References

2017 concert tours
2018 concert tours
Depeche Mode concert tours
Warpaint (band)